Marc John Orrell (born November 7, 1982) is an American guitarist known for being a former member of the Boston Celtic Punk band the Dropkick Murphys. He joined the band in 2000, he was 17 years old, while they were recording Sing Loud, Sing Proud and remained with the group until January 2008, when he left to pursue a different musical style.

Orrell has played with the bands The Eleventh Hour, Gimme Danger, Far From Finished, The Black Pacific, and most recently, Wild Roses.

In June 2019, Orrell, alongside Flogging Molly's Ted Hutt and The Pogues' James Fearnley announced the formation of a new supergroup, The Walker Roaders. The Walker Roaders' debut record was released on August 23, 2019.

References

External links 
 

1982 births
Living people
American punk rock guitarists
American people of Irish descent
American rock guitarists
American male guitarists
Musicians from Worcester, Massachusetts
Dropkick Murphys members
People from Grafton, Massachusetts
Guitarists from Massachusetts